Javier Reátegui Rosello (born April 28, 1944) is a Possible Peru Alliance member and  a former Peruvian Interior Minister. He resigned in 2005 due to events relating to Antauro Humala occupying a rural police station in Andahuaylas.

References

Peruvian Ministers of Interior
1944 births
Living people
Place of birth missing (living people)